The 1995 Barcelona City Council election, also the 1995 Barcelona municipal election, was held on Sunday, 28 May 1995, to elect the 5th City Council of the municipality of Barcelona. All 41 seats in the City Council were up for election. The election was held simultaneously with regional elections in thirteen autonomous communities and local elections all throughout Spain.

The unveiling of numerous corruption scandals throughout 1994 affecting Felipe González's Socialist government marked the electoral campaign. For the first time in 16 years, a real possibility for change in the local government resulted in a heated race between Socialists' Party of Catalonia (PSC) candidate and incumbent Mayor Pasqual Maragall and Convergence and Union (CiU) candidate Miquel Roca. Another factors influencing the political debate were the People's Party (PP) rise in opinion polls as well as Republican Left of Catalonia (ERC) recovery.

The election resulted in a surprising comfortable win for PSC and Pasqual Maragall, which was elected for a fourth consecutive term in office with 16 seats and 38.4%. On the other hand, CiU suffered from the PP growth and obtained its worst result since 1983, winning 13 seats and 30.6%. The People's Party nearly doubled its 1991 result with 7 seats and 16.6%, while both Initiative for Catalonia (IC) and ERC improved their electoral performances, with the latter narrowly surpassing the 5% threshold to enter the City Council.

Electoral system
The City Council of Barcelona was the top-tier administrative and governing body of the municipality of Barcelona, composed of the mayor, the government council and the elected plenary assembly. Elections to the local councils in Spain were fixed for the fourth Sunday of May every four years.

Voting for the local assembly was on the basis of universal suffrage, which comprised all nationals over 18 years of age, registered in the municipality of Barcelona and in full enjoyment of their political rights, as well as resident non-nationals whose country of origin allowed Spanish nationals to vote in their own elections by virtue of a treaty. Local councillors were elected using the D'Hondt method and a closed list proportional representation, with an electoral threshold of five percent of valid votes—which included blank ballots—being applied in each local council. Councillors were allocated to municipal councils based on the following scale:

The mayor was indirectly elected by the plenary assembly. A legal clause required that mayoral candidates earned the vote of an absolute majority of councillors, or else the candidate of the most-voted party in the assembly was to be automatically appointed to the post. In the event of a tie, the appointee would be determined by lot.

The electoral law allowed for parties and federations registered in the interior ministry, coalitions and groupings of electors to present lists of candidates. Parties and federations intending to form a coalition ahead of an election were required to inform the relevant Electoral Commission within ten days of the election call, whereas groupings of electors needed to secure the signature of a determined amount of the electors registered in the municipality for which they were seeking election, disallowing electors from signing for more than one list of candidates. For the case of Barcelona, as its population was over 1,000,001, at least 8,000 signatures were required.

Opinion polls
The table below lists voting intention estimates in reverse chronological order, showing the most recent first and using the dates when the survey fieldwork was done, as opposed to the date of publication. Where the fieldwork dates are unknown, the date of publication is given instead. The highest percentage figure in each polling survey is displayed with its background shaded in the leading party's colour. If a tie ensues, this is applied to the figures with the highest percentages. The "Lead" column on the right shows the percentage-point difference between the parties with the highest percentages in a poll. When available, seat projections determined by the polling organisations are displayed below (or in place of) the percentages in a smaller font; 21 seats were required for an absolute majority in the City Council of Barcelona (22 until 1 January 1992).

Results

Notes

References
Opinion poll sources

Other

Barcelona
1995
1990s in Barcelona
1995 in Catalonia